Mar Raphael Thattil is an Indian Catholic prelate of the Syro-Malabar Church. He has been a bishop since 2010 and the first bishop of the Eparchy (Diocese) of Shamshabad since 2018. The Diocese of Shamshabad is headquartered in Telangana and has jurisdiction over Syro-Malabar Catholics in Telangana, Andhra Pradesh, North India, Central India, and Northeast India. As per Pope Francis's October 2017 letter, through the creation of the Shamshabad Diocese, ‘all India jurisdiction’ of the Syro-Malabar Church has been restored.

Early life
Thattil was born in Thrissur on 21 April 1956. He did his schooling at St Thomas College High School, Thrissur, and joined St Mary's Minor Seminary, Thope on 4 July 1971. He did his ecclesiastical studies in St Thomas Apostolic Seminary, Vadavathoor, and he was ordained priest by Mar Joseph Kundukulam on 21 December 1980.

Career
Thattil was first appointed as the Assistant Vicar of Aranattukara and later as Father Prefect of minor seminary. He was then sent to Pontifical Oriental Institute, Rome for doing his Bachelor of Theology and Doctor of Canon Law. After coming back from Rome, he was appointed as the Director of Catechism. In 1998 he was appointed as the first Rector of the Mary Matha Major Seminary. On 15 January 2010 he was appointed as Auxiliary Bishop of Syro-Malabar Catholic Archdiocese of Thrissur and Titular Bishop of Buruni.

Pope Francis appointed Bishop Raphael Thattil to the office of the Apostolic Visitor for the Syro-Malabar faithful in India residing outside the proper territory of the Major Archiepiscopal Church. 

Pope Francis named him the first Bishop of the Syro-Malabar Catholic Eparchy of Shamshabad on 10 October 2017 and he was installed on 7 January 2018.

References

External links
Vatican biography

Living people
1956 births
Christian clergy from Thrissur
Syro-Malabar Catholics
20th-century Eastern Catholic clergy
Syro-Malabar bishops
Pontifical Oriental Institute alumni
21st-century Eastern Catholic bishops